KLEV-LP (107.9 FM) is a radio station licensed to Leadville, Colorado, United States.  The station is currently owned by State of Colorado Telecommunication Services.

References

External links
 

LEV-LP
Radio stations established in 2003
2003 establishments in Colorado
LEV-LP